The Manitoba Liberal Party fielded a full slate of 57 candidates in the 2003 provincial election, and won two seats to remain as the third-largest party in the legislature.  Some of the party's candidates have their own biography pages; information on others may be found here.

This page also provides information for candidates in by-elections between 2003 and 2007.

Candidates

Byelections
Fort Whyte, 13 December 2005: Jean Paterson

Footnotes

2003